Scarlet woman may refer to:

 A female prostitute
 The Whore of Babylon, a symbolic female figure in the Book of Revelation
 Babalon, a goddess in the occult system of Thelema
 The Scarlet Woman, a 1916 American drama film
 The Scarlet Woman (1924), a British comedy film
 "Scarlet Woman", a song by Weather Report from the 1974 album Mysterious Traveller